Sam Riggs Airpark  is a privately owned public-use airport located seven nautical miles (13 km) south of the central business district of Claremore, in Rogers County, Oklahoma, United States.

Facilities 
It has two runways with turf surfaces: 4/22 is 2,760 by 35 feet (841 x 11 m) and 18/36 is 1,550 by 110 feet (472 x 34 m). Runway 04/22 is closed indefinitely.

References

External links 
 Aerial image as of 24 February 1995 from USGS The National Map
 

Airports in Oklahoma
Buildings and structures in Rogers County, Oklahoma